Melanopsis is a genus of freshwater snails with a gill and an operculum, aquatic gastropod mollusks in the family Melanopsidae.

The genus first appeared in the Cretaceous.

Melanopsis is the type genus of the family Melanopsidae.

Distribution
These snails are found in southern Europe, North Africa, Asia Minor, New Caledonia and New Zealand.

Description
Their shells are ovate, with a short spire, and a large elongated body whorl. The outer lip of the aperture is thin, but the inner lip has a smooth parietal callus, thickened into a pad over the parietal wall.

Species

Species within the genus Melanopsis include:

 † Melanopsis aaronsohni Blanckenhorn in Blanckenhorn & Oppenheim, 1927 †
 † Melanopsis abbreviata Brusina, 1874 
  Melanopsis abichi Calvert & Neumayr, 1880 
 † Melanopsis acanthica Neumayr, 1869 
 † Melanopsis acanthicoides Hoernes, 1877
 † Melanopsis acuta Handmann, 1882
 † Melanopsis aetolica  Neumayr, 1876 
 † Melanopsis affinis Férussac, 1819 
 Melanopsis ahuiri Ahuir, 2014
 † Melanopsis ajkaensis Tausch, 1886
 † Melanopsis alutensis Stefanescu, 1896  
 Melanopsis ammonis Tristram, 1865
 † Melanopsis anceps Gaudry & Fischer in Gaudry, 1867
 † Melanopsis ancillaroidesDeshayes, 1825 
 Melanopsis andrussowi Brusina, 1885 
 † Melanopsis angulata Neumayr, 1880
 † Melanopsis anili Taner, 1997 
 † Melanopsis anistratenkoi Neubauer, Harzhauser, Georgopoulou, Mandic & Kroh, 2014 
 † Melanopsis antediluviana(Poiret, 1801) 
 Melanopsis arbalensis Pérès, 1939
 † Melanopsis arsinovi Brusina, 1902
 † Melanopsis astathmeta Brusina, 1897
 † Melanopsis astrapaea Brusina, 1876 
 † Melanopsis atanasiui Schoverth, 1953 
 † Melanopsis austriaca Handmann, 1882
 † Melanopsis avellana  F. Sandberger, 1870 
 † Melanopsis balatonensis (Cossmann, 1909)
 † Melanopsis banatica Jekelius, 1944 
 † Melanopsis bandeli Schütt, 1988
 † Melanopsis barthai Bandel, 2000 
 † Melanopsis bartolinii Capellini, 1873
 † Melanopsis bergeroni Stefanescu, 1896
 † Melanopsis bicoronata Brusina, 1884
 † Melanopsis bleunardi Porumbaru, 1881 
 † Melanopsis bonelli Manzoni, 1870
 † Melanopsis bouei Férussac, 1823
 † Melanopsis brachyptycha Neumayr, 1880
 † Melanopsis braueri Neumayr in Neumayr & Paul, 1875
 † Melanopsis breastensis Stefanescu, 1896
 Melanopsis brevicula Pallary, 1918
 † Melanopsis brongniarti Locard, 1883 
 † Melanopsis brusinai Lörenthey, 1902 
 Melanopsis buccinoidea (Olivier, 1801)
 † Melanopsis buccinulum Melleville, 1843 
 † Melanopsis bukovaci Brusina, 1902 
 † Melanopsis camptogramma Brusina, 1876
 † Melanopsis capreniensis Fontannes, 1887 
 † Melanopsis carasiensis Jekelius, 1944
 † Melanopsis cari Pavlović, 1927 
 Melanopsis cariosa (Linnaeus, 1767)
 † Melanopsis carusi (Brusina, 1902) 
 † Melanopsis caryota Brusina, 1902 
 Melanopsis cerithiopsis
 Melanopsis chlorotica Pallary, 1921
 † Melanopsis cikosi Brusina, 1902 
 † Melanopsis citharella Merian, 1849
 † Melanopsis clava Sandberger, 1875
 † Melanopsis clavigera Neumayr in Neumayr & Paul, 1875
  † Melanopsis coaequata 
  † Melanopsis cognata Brusina, 1878
 † Melanopsis confusa Strausz, 1941
 † Melanopsis conoidea Pană, 2003 
 † Melanopsis constricta Brusina, 1878 
 † Melanopsis corici Neubauer, Mandic, Harzhauser & Hrvatović, 2013
 † Melanopsis coronata Brusina, 1878
 † Melanopsis correcta Stefanescu, 1896 
 Melanopsis costata (Olivier, 1804)
 † Melanopsis cotrocenensis Cobălcescu, 1883 
 † Melanopsis covurluensis Cobălcescu, 1883
 † Melanopsis croatica Brusina, 1884 
 † Melanopsis cuisiensis Dominici & Kowalke, 2014 
 † Melanopsis cvijici Brusina, 1902
 † Melanopsis cylindrica (Stoliczka, 1862)
 † Melanopsis dalmatina Brusina, 1884 
 † Melanopsis decollata Stoliczka, 1862 
 † Melanopsis defensa Fuchs, 1870 
 † Melanopsis delessei Tournouër, 1875 
 † Melanopsis depereti Boistel, 1898 
 † Melanopsis dianaeformis Andrusov, 1909 
 † Melanopsis dichtli Handmann, 1882 
 † Melanopsis doriae Issel, 1865
 † Melanopsis draghiceniani Cobălcescu, 1883 
 † Melanopsis dufouri A. Férussac, 1822 
 † Melanopsis eleis Oppenheim, 1891
 † Melanopsis elophila Pallary, 1925 
 † Melanopsis entziBrusina, 1902: synonym of  †Melanopsis fuchsi Handmann, 1882  (junior synonym)
 † Melanopsis esperioides Stefanescu, 1896
 Melanopsis etrusca Brot, 1862
 † Melanopsis eulimopsis Brusina, 1902 
 † Melanopsis euphrosinae (Cobălcescu, 1883)
 † Melanopsis eurystoma Neumayr in Neumayr & Paul, 1875 
 † Melanopsis faberi Brusina, 1884
 † Melanopsis fallax Pantanelli, 1886 
 † Melanopsis fateljensis Neubauer, Mandic & Harzhauser, 2014
 Melanopsis ferussaci
 † Melanopsis filifera Neumayr, 1880 
 † Melanopsis fossilis (Gmelin, 1791) -  late Neogene
 † Melanopsis freybergi Kühn, 1951 
 † Melanopsis friedeli Brusina, 1885 
 † Melanopsis fritzei Thomä, 1845 
 Melanopsis frustulum Morelet, 1857
 † Melanopsis fuchsi Handmann, 1882 
 † Melanopsis fusulatina Sacco, 1895 
 † Melanopsis gearyae Neubauer, Harzhauser, Georgopoulou, Mandic & Kroh, 2014 
 † Melanopsis geniculata Brusina, 1874
 † Melanopsis gersondei Willmann, 1981 
 † Melanopsis glandicula Sandberger, 1875
 † Melanopsis glaubrechti Neubauer & Harzhauser in Neubauer et al., 2015 
 † Melanopsis gorceixi Tournouër, 1875 
 † Melanopsis graciosa Seninski, 1905 
 † Melanopsis granum Calvert & Neumayr, 1880
 † Melanopsis guernei Brusina, 1902
 † Melanopsis handmanniana
  † Melanopsis hantkeni Hofmann, 1870
 † Melanopsis harpula Neumayr in Neumayr & Paul, 1875 
 † Melanopsis hastata Neumayr in Neumayr & Paul, 1875 
 † Melanopsis haueri Handmann, 1882 
Melanopsis heliophila Bourguignat, 1884
 † Melanopsis hennersdorfensis Fischer, 1993 
 † Melanopsis hranilovici Brusina, 1897 
 † Melanopsis hybostoma Brusina, 1874
 † Melanopsis impressa Krauss, 1852 
 † Melanopsis incerta Férussac, 1823 
 † Melanopsis inconstans Neumayr, 1869 
 † Melanopsis inermis Handmann, 1882 
 † Melanopsis inexspectata Willmann, 1981 
 † Melanopsis involuta Handmann, 1882 
 † Melanopsis irregularis Handmann, 1882 
 Melanopsis isabelae Ahuir, 2016
 † Melanopsis karici Pavlović, 1903 
 † Melanopsis katzeri Brusina, 1904 
 † Melanopsis kleinii Kurr, 1856 
 † Melanopsis klerici Brusina, 1893 
 † Melanopsis kotschyi Philippi, 1847
 † Melanopsis krambergeri Brusina, 1884 
 † Melanopsis kupensis Fuchs, 1870 
 † Melanopsis kurdica Brusina, 1902 
 † Melanopsis laevigata (Lamarck, 1792) 
 † Melanopsis lanceolata Neumayr in Neumayr & Paul, 1875 
 † Melanopsis langhofferi Pavlović, 1927†
 † Melanopsis lanzaeana Brusina, 1874†
 † Melanopsis laubrierei Carez, 1880 
 † Melanopsis lebedai Lueger, 1980 
 † Melanopsis lepavinensis Brusina, 1897†
 Melanopsis letourneuxi Bourguignat, 1880
 † Melanopsis lomnickii Wenz, 1928
 † Melanopsis longa Deshayes in Férussac, 1851 
 † Melanopsis longirostris Pallary, 1920
 Melanopsis lorcana Guirao, 1854
 † Melanopsis lorentheyi Andrusov, 1909
 † Melanopsis lorioli Locard, 1893 
 † Melanopsis lozanici Brusina, 1893
 † Melanopsis lucanensis Neubauer in Neubauer et al., 2011 
 † Melanopsis lyrata Neumayr, 1869 
 † Melanopsis macrosculpturata Papp, 1953 
 † Melanopsis magna Lubenescu, 1985 
 Melanopsis magnifica Bourguignat, 1884
 † Melanopsis magyari Neubauer, Harzhauser, Georgopoulou, Mandic & Kroh, 2014 
 † Melanopsis major Férussac, 1823 
 † Melanopsis mariei Crosse, 1869
 † Melanopsis medinae Neubauer, Mandic, Harzhauser & Hrvatović, 2013 (unaccepted, junior synonym)
 † Melanopsis metochiana Pavlović, 1932 
 † Melanopsis minotauri Willmann, 1980 
 † Melanopsis mitraeformis Andrusov, 1909 
 † Melanopsis moesiensis Jekelius, 1944 
 † Melanopsis mojsisovicsi (Neumayr, 1880) 
 Melanopsis mourebeyensis Pallary, 1921
 † Melanopsis multiformis 
 † Melanopsis narzolina  d'Archiac in Viquesnel, 1846
 † Melanopsis nesici Brusina, 1893 
 † Melanopsis neumayri Tournouër, 1874 
 † Melanopsis nobilis Seninski, 1905 
 † Melanopsis obediensis 
 † Melanopsis obsoleta Fuchs, 1873 
 † Melanopsis ogerieni Locard, 1883 
 † Melanopsis olivula Grateloup, 1838 
 † Melanopsis oltszakadatensis Halaváts, 1914 
 † Melanopsis onusta Stefanescu, 1896 
 † Melanopsis onychia Brusina, 1874 
 † Melanopsis orientalis Bukowski, 1892 
 † Melanopsis oroposi Papp, 1979 
 † Melanopsis ovosimilis Willmann, 1981
 † Melanopsis ovularis  Watelet, 1853 
 † Melanopsis oxycantha Brusina, 1902 
 † Melanopsis pachecoi Royo Gómez, 1922
 † Melanopsis papkesiensis Bandel, 2000
 † Melanopsis paradoxa (Brusina, 1892) 
 Melanopsis parreyssii (Philippi, 1847) - synonym: Melanopsis hungarica Kormos, 1904
 † Melanopsis paulovici Bourguignat, 1880
 † Melanopsis pavlovici Brusina, 1902 
 † Melanopsis pedemontana Sacco, 1889
 † Melanopsis pentagona Brusina, 1892 
 † Melanopsis pergamena Calvert & Neumayr, 1880 
 † Melanopsis petkovici Pavlović, 1931 
 Melanopsis pechinati Bourguignat, 1868
 † Melanopsis petrovici Brusina, 1893 
 † Melanopsis pleuroplagia (Bourguignat, 1880) 
 † Melanopsis pleurotomoides Pavlović, 1927 
 † Melanopsis plicatella Neumayr, 1880 
 † Melanopsis plicatula Brusina, 1874 
 † Melanopsis porumbari Porumbaru, 1881 
 † Melanopsis posterior Papp, 1953 
 † Melanopsis praecursor Schütt in Schütt & Ortal, 1993 
 Melanopsis praemorsa 	(Linnaeus, 1758) - type species
 † Melanopsis protopygmaea Halaváts, 1914
 † Melanopsis pseudoaustriaca Sauerzopf, 1952 
 † Melanopsis pseudobesa Bandel, 2000 
 † Melanopsis pseudocostata Oppenheim, 1891 
 † Melanopsis pseudoimpressa  
 † Melanopsis pseudopygmaea Jekelius, 1944 
 † Melanopsis pseudoscalaria Sandberger, 1886 
 † Melanopsis pterochila Brusina, 1874 
 † Melanopsis pumila (Brusina, 1902) 
 † Melanopsis pusilla Handmann, 1882 
 † Melanopsis pygmaea  Hörnes, 1856 
 † Melanopsis pyrum Neumayr in Neumayr & Paul, 1875 
 † Melanopsis rarinodosa (Brusina, 1892) 
 † Melanopsis recurrens Brusina, 1874 
 † Melanopsis retusa Brusina, 1904 
 † Melanopsis revelata Pallary, 1920 
 † Melanopsis rhodanica Locard, 1883†
  Melanopsis rifi Ahuir, 2014
 † Melanopsis rudis Brusina, 1902 
 † Melanopsis rumana Tournouër, 1880 
 † Melanopsis sabolici Brusina, 1902 
 Melanopsis saharica Bourguignat, 1864
 † Melanopsis salamei Alhejoj & Bandel, 2013 
 † Melanopsis sandbergeri Neumayr, 1869 
 Melanopsis saulcyi Bourguignat, 1853
 † Melanopsis scalariformis Papp, 1953 
 Melanopsis scalaris Gassies, 1856
 † Melanopsis scansoria Stefanescu, 1896 
 † Melanopsis scripta Fuchs, 1870 
 † Melanopsis senatoria Handmann, 1887 
 † Melanopsis seninskii Wenz, 1928 
 † Melanopsis serbica Brusina, 1893 
 † Melanopsis serchensis Vidal, 1874 - from Maastrichtian
 Melanopsis sharhabili Bandel, 2000
 † Melanopsis simulata Pallary, 1925 
 † Melanopsis sinjana Brusina, 1874 
 † Melanopsis sinzowi Brusina, 1885 
 † Melanopsis slavonica Neumayr in Neumayr & Paul, 1875 
 † Melanopsis soceni Jekelius, 1944 
 † Melanopsis sodalis Deshayes, 1862 
 † Melanopsis soldaniana Pantanelli, 1879 
 † Melanopsis sostarici Brusina, 1897 
 † Melanopsis soubeirani Porumbaru, 1881 
 † Melanopsis spinicostata Rolle, 1860 
 † Melanopsis spinigera Seninski, 1905 
 † Melanopsis spiridioni Pallary, 1916 
 † Melanopsis sporadum Tournouër, 1876 
 † Melanopsis strangulata Brusina, 1902 
 † Melanopsis striata Handmann, 1887
 † Melanopsis stricturata Brusina, 1892 
 † Melanopsis sturi  (unaccepted, rank changed)
 Melanopsis suarezi Ahuir, 2016
 † Melanopsis subangulosa Sandberger, 1875 
 † Melanopsis subbuccinoides d'Orbigny, 1851 
 Melanopsis subgraëllsiana Bourguignat, 1864
 † Melanopsis subpraerosa Andrusov, 1909
 † Melanopsis subpyrum Penecke, 1886 
 † Melanopsis substricturata (Jekelius, 1944) 
 † Melanopsis suskalovici Pavlović, 1903
 † Melanopsis synaniae Esu & Girotti, 2015 
 † Melanopsis tenuiplicata Neumayr, 1880 
 † Melanopsis tihanyensis  (unaccepted, junior synonym)
 † Melanopsis timacensis Živković, 1893 
 † Melanopsis tinnyensis Wenz, 1919 
 † Melanopsis tortispina Papp, 1953 
 Melanopsis tricarinata (Bruguière, 1789)
 † Melanopsis trivortiana Locard, 1883 
 † Melanopsis trojana Hoernes, 1877 
 † Melanopsis trstenjaki Brusina, 1884 
 † Melanopsis tuberculata Pavlović, 1927
 Melanopsis turgida Pallary, 1927
 † Melanopsis turislavica Jekelius, 1944 
 † Melanopsis turriformis 
 † Melanopsis valdeci Brusina, 1902 
 † Melanopsis vandeveldi Bukowski, 1892 
 † Melanopsis varicosa Handmann, 1882 
 † Melanopsis vilicici Brusina, 1902 
 † Melanopsis vindobonensis Fuchs, 1870 
 † Melanopsis viquesneli Pavlović, 1932
 † Melanopsis visianiana Brusina, 1874 
 † Melanopsis vitalisi Strausz, 1942 
 † Melanopsis vitezovici Brusina, 1902 
 † Melanopsis vitzoui Porumbaru, 1881 
 † Melanopsis vrcinensis Neubauer, Harzhauser, Georgopoulou, Mandic & Kroh, 2014 
 Melanopsis wagneri
 † Melanopsis wilhelmi Esu & Girotti, 2015
  † Melanopsis wolfgangfischeri Neubauer, Harzhauser, Kroh, Georgopoulou & Mandic, 2014
 † Melanopsis zitteli Neumayr, 1869 
 † Melanopsis zujovici Brusina, 1893 

(Extinct taxa indicated by a dagger, †.)
 Species brought into synonymy 
  † Melanopsis abbreviata cosmanni Pallary, 1916: synonym of  † Melanopsis abbreviata cossmanni Pallary, 1916  
 † Melanopsis acanthicoides var. abichi Calvert & Neumayr, 1880: synonym of † Melanopsis abichi Calvert & Neumayr, 1880 
 † Melanopsis acanthicoides var. pergamenica Calvert & Neumayr, 1880: synonym of † Melanopsis pergamena Calvert & Neumayr, 1880 
 † Melanopsis acanthicoides var. trojana Hoernes, 1877: synonym of † Melanopsis trojana Hoernes, 1877 
 Melanopsis aperta Gassies, 1863: synonym  of Melanopsis frustulum Morelet, 1857
 Melanopsis aurantiaca Gassies, 1874: synonym  of Melanopsis frustulum Morelet, 1857
 † Melanopsis austriaca var. serbica Brusina, 1902: synonym of † Melanopsis haueri ripanjensis Neubauer, Harzhauser, Kroh, Georgopoulou & Mandic, 2014 
 Melanopsis brevis Morelet, 1857: synonym of Melanopsis frustulum Morelet, 1857
 Melanopsis brotiana Gassies, 1874: synonym of Melanopsis frustulum Morelet, 1857
 † Melanopsis callosa var. curta Locard, 1893: synonym of  † Melanopsis kleinii kleinii Kurr, 1856 
 Melanopsis carinata Gassies, 1863: synonym of Melanopsis frustulum Morelet, 1857
 Melanopsis curta Gassies, 1870: synonym of Melanopsis frustulum Morelet, 1857
 †  Melanopsis cylindrica petrovici (Brusina, 1893): synonym of † Melanopsis petrovici Brusina, 1893 
 Melanopsis dumbeensis Crosse, 1869: synonym of Melanopsis frustulum Morelet, 1857
 Melanopsis elegans Gassies, 1869: synonym of Melanopsis frustulum Morelet, 1857
 Melanopsis elongata Gassies, 1874: synonym of Melanopsis frustulum Morelet, 1857
 Melanopsis esperi Férussac, 1823: synonym of Esperiana esperi (Férussac, 1823)
 Melanopsis fasciata Gassies, 1874: synonym of Melanopsis frustulum Morelet, 1857
 Melanopsis fragilis Gassies, 1874: synonym of Melanopsis frustulum Morelet, 1857
 † Melanopsis fossilis var. accedens Handmann, 1887: synonym of † Melanopsis fossilis (Gmelin, 1791) 
 † Melanopsis fossilis var. propinqua Handmann, 1887: synonym of † Melanopsis fossilis (Gmelin, 1791) 
 † Melanopsis fossilis var. proclivis Handmann, 1887: synonym of † Melanopsis fossilis (Gmelin, 1791) 
 † Melanopsis fossilis rugosa Handmann, 1887: synonym of † Melanopsis wolfgangfischeri Neubauer, Harzhauser, Kroh, Georgopoulou & Mandic, 2014 
 Melanopsis fulgurans Gassies, 1859: synonym of Melanopsis frustulum Morelet, 1857
 Melanopsis fulminata Brot, 1879: synonym of Melanopsis frustulum Morelet, 1857
 Melanopsis fusca Gassies, 1870: synonym of Melanopsis frustulum Morelet, 1857
 Melanopsis fusiformis Gassies, 1870: synonym of Melanopsis frustulum Morelet, 1857
 Melanopsis gassiesiana Crosse, 1867: synonym of Melanopsis frustulum Morelet, 1857
 † Melanopsis harpula capreniensis Fontannes, 1887: synonym of  † Melanopsis capreniensis Fontannes, 1887 
 † Melanopsis impressa bonellii Manzoni, 1870: synonym of † Melanopsis bonellii Manzoni, 1870 
 Melanopsis lamberti Souverbie, 1872: synonym of Melanopsis mariei Crosse, 1869
 Melanopsis lentiginosa Reeve, 1860: synonym of Melanopsis frustulum Morelet, 1857
 Melanopsis lineolata Gassies, 1857: synonym of Melanopsis frustulum Morelet, 1857
 Melanopsis lirata Gassies, 1869: synonym of Melanopsis frustulum Morelet, 1857
 Melanopsis livida Gassies, 1863: synonym of Melanopsis frustulum Morelet, 1857
 Melanopsis neritoides Gassies, 1859: synonym of Melanopsis frustulum Morelet, 1857
 Melanopsis retoutiana Gassies, 1863: synonym of Melanopsis frustulum Morelet, 1857
 Melanopsis robusta Gassies, 1870: synonym of Melanopsis frustulum Morelet, 1857
 † Melanopsis rumana var. correcta Stefanescu, 1896: synonym of † Melanopsis correcta Stefanescu, 1896 
 † Melanopsis sandbergeri correcta Stefanescu, 1896: synonym of † Melanopsis correcta Stefanescu, 1896 
 Melanopsis souverbieana Gassies, 1870: synonym of Melanopsis frustulum Morelet, 1857
 Melanopsis trifasciata Gray, 1843: synonym of Zemelanopsis trifasciata (Gray, 1843)
 Melanopsis variegata Morelet, 1857: synonym of Melanopsis frustulum Morelet, 1857
 Melanopsis zonites Gassies, 1870: synonym of Melanopsis frustulum Morelet, 1857
 † Melanopsis (Canthidomus) bouei var. megacantha Handmann, 1887: synonym of † Melanopsis bouei megacantha Handmann, 1887 
 † Melanopsis (Canthidomus) bouei var. monacantha Handmann, 1887: synonym of  † Melanopsis bouei bouei Férussac, 1823 
 † Melanopsis (Canthidomus) bouei var. multicostata Handmann, 1887: synonym of † Melanopsis bouei multicostata Handmann, 1887 
 † Melanopsis (Canthidomus) defensa elongata Gillet & Marinescu, 1971: synonym of  † Melanopsis defensa defensa Fuchs, 1870

References

External links 
 Férussac, J.B.L. d'Audebard de, Férussac, A.E.J.P.J.F.d'Audebard de. (1807). Essai d'une méthode conchyliologique appliquée aux mollusques fluviatiles et terrestres d'après la considération de l'animal et de son test. Nouvelle édition augmentée d'une synonymie des espèces les plus remarquables, d'une table de concordance systématique de celles qui ont été décrites par Géoffroy, Poiret et Draparnaud, avec Müller et Linné, et terminée par un catalogue d'espèces observées en divers lieux de la France. Delance, Paris. xvi + 142 pp
 Neumayr, M. (1880). Tertiäre Binnenmollusken aus Bosnien und der Hercegovina. Jahrbuch der kaiserlichen und königlichen geologischen Reichsanstalt. 30 (2), 463-486

Melanopsidae
Taxonomy articles created by Polbot